The Falls of Dochart (Scottish Gaelic:Eas Dochart) are a cascade of waterfalls situated on the River Dochart at Killin in Perthshire, Scotland, near the western end of Loch Tay. The Bridge of Dochart, first constructed in 1760, crosses the river at Killin offering a view of the falls as they cascade over the rocks and around the island of Inchbuie, which is the ancient burial place of the MacNab clan.

Nature conservation 
The waterfall and its surrounding area belongs to the Loch Lomond and The Trossachs National Park.

References

External links
 
 Killin.info community website, guides, photos, media, news.
 YouTube.com video of Killin area featuring the Falls of Dochart.

Waterfalls of Stirling (council area)